The 13287 / 13288 South Bihar Express is an Express train belonging to East Central Railway zone that runs between  and  in India. It is currently being operated with 13287/13288 train numbers on a daily basis.

Service

The 13287 South Bihar Express has an average speed of 45 km/hr and covers 1110 km in 24h 35m. The 13288 South Bihar Express has an average speed of 46 km/hr and covers 1110 km in 24h 15m.

Route and halts

Traction

From 
Asansol Junction to Durg Junction it is hauled by a Tatanagar-based WAP-7 electric locomotive.

Direction reversal
The train reverses its direction two times, at Asansol Junction railway station and at Tatanagar Junction railway station.

See also 

 Rajendra Nagar Terminal railway station
 Durg railway station

Notes

References 

Transport in Patna
Transport in Durg
Named passenger trains of India
Rail transport in Chhattisgarh
Rail transport in Odisha
Rail transport in Jharkhand
Rail transport in West Bengal
Rail transport in Bihar